The GE B30-7 is a diesel-electric locomotive model produced by GE from 1977 to 1983 as part of their Dash 7 Series, featuring a 16 cylinder engine producing 3,000 horsepower. A total of 399 units were produced, including 120 cabless B30-7A(B) units. The B30-7 was GE's successor to the U30B.

Design and production history 

The B30-7 was designed from the B23-7, and was nearly identical in appearance. However, the B30-7 featured 3,000 horsepower, compared to the B23-7's 2,300 horsepower. Almost all were built with FB2 trucks.

GE produced several variants of the B30-7. These were developed from an experimental modification of the B23-7's 12-cylinder engine in June 1980 to uprate it to 3,000 horsepower. By using the 12 cylinder prime mover instead of the 16 cylinder version, railroads saved money on fuel and maintenance, and most subsequent B30-7s incorporated a 12 cylinder engine. Variants using this engine were the B30-7A, B30-7A1 and the cabless B30-7A. The B30-7A without a cab is unofficially known as the B30-7A(B) to distinguish it from the version with a cab.

B30-7As were built only for the Missouri Pacific Railroad and are externally identical to the 16-cylinder version B30-7. B30-7A1s, which featured a high short hood, were built only for the Southern Railway.

Cabless B30-7A(B)s were built only for the Burlington Northern Railroad.

Operational history 
Shortline railroad Providence and Worcester Railroad acquired five ex-BN B30-7A(B) cabless units, reclassified as B30-7AB units, numbered #3004-3008, in 2001. National Railway Equipment acquired these locomotives in 2015. Most of the remaining B30-7A(B)s were retired in 1999.

In early 2017, Chesapeake and Ohio unit 8272 was repainted by CSX into its original Chessie System livery and donated to the Lake Shore Railway Museum.

Original owners

References 

 

B30-7
B-B locomotives
Diesel-electric locomotives of the United States
Railway locomotives introduced in 1977
Locomotives with cabless variants
Freight locomotives
Standard gauge locomotives of the United States